Two ships of the Royal Navy have borne the name HMS Scotsman, after an inhabitant of Scotland:

  was an  launched in 1918.
  was an S-class submarine launched in 1944 and broken up in 1964.

Royal Navy ship names